Ritschard is a surname. Notable people with the surname include:

Alexander Ritschard (born 1994), Swiss-American tennis player
Willi Ritschard (1918–1983), Swiss politician